CWY may refer to:
 Canada World Youth, an international non-profit
 Cherokee, an indigenous people of the United States
 Cherokee language
 Cleanaway, an Australian waste management firm
 Clearway (aviation)
 Conwy County Borough, in Wales
 Woodgate Aviation, a British aircraft charter